Trace is the name of:

Given name or nickname
 Trace Adkins (born 1962), American country singer, songwriter, and actor
 Trace Armstrong (born 1965), American former American football defensive end
 Trace Balla, Australian children's writer and illustrator
 Trace Beaulieu (born 1958), American puppeteer, writer, and actor
 Trace Bundy, instrumental acoustic guitar player who lives and performs in Boulder, Colorado
 Trace Coquillette (born 1974), retired Major League Baseball third baseman and second baseman
 Trace Cyrus (born 1989), American musician
 Trace DeMeyer (born 1956), multi-genre author, artist, poet and journalist of Shawnee-Cherokee descent
 Trace Gallagher (born 1961), American journalist and television news anchor for Fox News Channel
 Trace Lysette, American actress
 Trace McSorley (born 1995), American football quarterback

Surname
 Al Trace (1900–1993), American songwriter and orchestra leader
 Arther Trace (1926–2005), American author, critic and educational reformer
 Arthur Trace (born 1979), American magician
 Ben Trace (1890–1976), American songwriter
 Christopher Trace (1933–1992), English actor and television presenter

See also
Trayce, given name